Malgersdorf is a municipality in the district of Rottal-Inn in Bavaria in Germany.

References

Rottal-Inn